Upper Elochoman is a census-designated place (CDP) in Wahkiakum County, Washington, United States. The population was 193 at the 2010 census. The CDP includes the State Camp community.

References

Census-designated places in Washington (state)
Census-designated places in Wahkiakum County, Washington